William Joseph Roche (28 March 1895 in Limerick, Ireland – 26 June 1983 in Bandon, County Cork, Ireland) was an Irish rugby union player who represented  Munster, Ireland and the British Lions.  He also played club rugby for both University College Cork and Newport.

Club career
Between 1920 and 1927 Roche played club rugby for Newport and was captain during the 1926-27 season. In 1926 he captained the club against the  New Zealand Māoris in a game which ended in a 0-0 draw.

Rugby international

Ireland
Roche won 3 caps for Ireland during the 1920 Five Nations Championship. He made his debut against England at Lansdowne Road on 14 February in a 14-11 defeat. He then played against Scotland on 28 February at Inverleith in a 19-0 defeat. He won his final cap against France on 3 April in a 15-7 defeat at Lansdowne. While playing for Ireland, his teammates included Ernie Crawford.

British Lions
Roche was also selected for the British Lions squad for their 1924 tour of South Africa. However he did not play in any of the Test matches against South Africa.

References

1895 births
1983 deaths
Irish rugby union players
Ireland international rugby union players
Munster Rugby players
British & Irish Lions rugby union players from Ireland
University College Cork RFC players
Newport RFC players
Alumni of University College Cork
Rugby union players from Limerick (city)
Rugby union number eights
Expatriate rugby union players in Wales
Irish expatriate rugby union players
Irish expatriate sportspeople in Wales